Malaysian Mandarin is a variety of Mandarin Chinese spoken in Malaysia by ethnic Chinese in Malaysia. Today, Malaysian Mandarin is the lingua franca of the Malaysian Chinese community. 

Malaysian Mandarin speakers seldom translate local terms or names to Mandarin when they speak. They would prefer to verbally use Malay place names in their original Malay pronunciation: for instance, even though the street name "Jalan Bukit Kepong" is written as "" (literally "Bukit Kepong Road") in local Chinese printed media, the local Chinese almost never use  in daily conversations.  There are exceptions, for example Taiping, since this name is derived from the Chinese language, when people mention this place when speaking local Mandarin, they always use its Mandarin pronunciation, "", instead of using its Malay pronunciation, which is closer to "Taipeng".  Another example is when a place's Chinese translation varied vastly with its native Malay name, for example: for Teluk Intan, Seremban, Kota Kinabalu and Bau, they are preferably referred respectively as Ānsùn (which refers to "Teluk Anson", Teluk Intan's former colonial name), Fúróng Yàbì, Shilongmen.

Phonology

Malaysian Mandarin's phonology is closer to the Mandarin accents of Southern China, than towards the Beijing standard pronunciation, due to the influence of other dialects such as Cantonese and Hokkien.

In comparison with Standard Chinese, Taiwanese or Singaporean Mandarin, Malaysian Mandarin is clearly distinguished by its relatively tonally 'flat' sound as well as its extensive use of glottal stops and the "checked tone." This results in a distinct "clipped" sound compared to other forms of Mandarin.

 The phonemes "j", "x", and "h" (as in 级 ji, 西 xi, and 汉 han) tend to be pronounced as /t͡s/, /s/, and /h/ (rather than /t͡ɕ/, /ɕ/, and /x/)
 the "er" phoneme (as in 儿 or 二) is usually pronounced as /ə/ (instead of /ɚ/)
 the "i" phoneme (as in 吃, 十, or 日) is usually pronounced as /ɨ~ə/ (instead of /ɹ̩~ɻ̩/)
 the "r" phoneme (as in 然) is usually pronounced as /ɹ/ (similar to English, instead of /ʐ/)

Demographics
As of 2014, 93% of ethnic Chinese families in Malaysia speak varieties of Chinese, which includes Mandarin.

Early Ming and Qing immigrants
The majority of ethnic Chinese people living in Malaysia came from China during the Ming and Qing dynasties, between the 15th and early 20th centuries. Earlier immigrants married Malays and assimilated to a larger extent than later waves of migrants – they form a distinct sub-ethnic group known as the Peranakans, and their descendants speak Malay.

The majority of immigrants were speakers of Hokkien (Min Nan), Cantonese, Hakka, Teochew, and Hainanese. In the 19th century, Qing immigrants to Malaya had no single common language and were mostly uneducated peasants, and they tended to cluster themselves according to the ethno-linguistic group, usually corresponding to their place of origin, and worked with relatives and other speakers of the same language. In 1879, according to Isabella Bird, a visitor to the tin mining boomtown of Taiping, Perak, "five topolects of Chinese are spoken, and Chinamen constantly communicate with each other in Malay, because they can't understand each other's Chinese".

The Chinese languages spoken in Malaysia have over the years become localized (e.g. Penang Hokkien), as is apparent from the use of Malay and English loan words.  Words from other Chinese languages are also injected, depending on the educational and cultural background of the speaker (see Education in Malaysia and Rojak language).  Mandarin in Malaysia has also been localized, as a result of the influence of other Chinese variants spoken in Malaysia, rather than the Malay language. Loan words were discouraged in Mandarin instructions at local Chinese school and were regarded as mispronunciations.

See also
 Malaysian Chinese
Variants of Mandarin Chinese:
 Standard Mandarin
 Singaporean Mandarin
 Taiwanese Mandarin
 Philippine Mandarin
 Regional differences in the Chinese language

References

External links
 马来西亚华语－南洋的北方官话方言

Chinese-Malaysian culture
Mandarin Chinese
Languages of Malaysia